Pervomaysk, or Pervomaisk, is a popular Soviet toponym that is derived from the holiday May Day (Pervoye Maya), the International Workers' Day.

Pervomaysk or Pervomaisk may refer to:

Pervomaysk, Russia, toponyms in Russia
Pervomaisk, Ukraine, toponyms in Ukraine
Pervomaisc (disambiguation), toponyms in Moldova

See also
Pervomaysky (disambiguation)
Pervomaiske, a town in Crimea, Ukraine
Pervomaiske Raion, a district in Crimea, Ukraine